Rajendra Prasad Shukla ((10 February 1930 – 20 August 2006) was an indian politician from the state of Madhya Pradesh and Chhattisgarh. He had been an M.L.A. to Madhya Pradesh Legislative Assembly several times, he was elected Speaker there in mid 1980s, as minister in early 1990s. Later after formation of Chhattisgarh, he was elected from Kota, Bilaspur to Chhattisgarh Legislative Assembly and became first Speaker of Chhattisgarh. Rajendra Prasad Shukla had been a prestigious leader for Kargi road Kota.

Family Background 

Rajendra Prasad Shukla was married to Leela Devi Shukla, with whom he has 3 sons and 3 daughters.

Notes

1930 births
Speakers of the Madhya Pradesh Legislative Assembly
2006 deaths
Speakers of the Chhattisgarh Legislative Assembly
People from Bilaspur district, Chhattisgarh
Indian National Congress politicians
Chhattisgarh MLAs 2000–2003
Indian National Congress politicians from Madhya Pradesh